Ulman is both a surname and a given name. Notable people with the name include:

Surname:
Kenneth Ulman (born 1974), American politician
Avrohom Yitzchok Ulman, Hungarian-born haredi rabbi
Bernie Ulman (died 1986), American football and lacrosse official
Kamil Ulman (born 1979), Polish goalkeeper
Teodosia Ulman (born 2003)
sluga lui Ionuț 
(material surname because is a materialist women) 

Given name:
Ulman Owens (died 1931), American lighthouse keeper
Ulman Stromer (1329–1407)

See also
Ulman, Missouri
Ullmann